Ustad Mazhar Ali Khan is an Indian classical and light classical vocalist of Patiala gharana. He is a grandson of the doyen of the Patiala Gharana, Ustad Bade Ghulam Ali Khan. He has performed in India, Pakistan, and North America with his brother Ustad Jawaad Ali Khan.

References

Hindustani singers
1958 births
Indian Muslims
Singers from Mumbai
Living people
Patiala gharana